Katharina Mazepa (born Katharina Nahlik; 19 August 1995) is an Austrian model.

Early life 
Katharina Nahlik was born on 19 August 1995, and grew up in the Mariahilf district in Vienna, where she attended the Vienna Bilingual School, and made one year abroad in Malaysia for when she was 15. She studied environmental engineering at BOKU university in Vienna.

Career 
In 2014, Mazepa was crowned Miss Vienna, and has worked as an international model since.

Personal life 
In 2019, Mazepa married US diplomat Shilo Mazepa in Spoleto, Italy. The couple moved to Washington D.C. later that year. In 2021, she filed for divorce and the two are now separated. Amina Dagi the former Miss Universe contestant, was her bridesmaid.

Since 2022, Mazepa has been in a relationship with plastic surgeon Dr. Leonard Hochstein, who is the estranged husband of The Real Housewives of Miami star Lisa Hochstein.

References 

Living people
Austrian beauty pageant winners
1995 births
Austrian female models
Models from Vienna